The Grammy Award for Best Pop Instrumental Performance was awarded between 1969 and 2011.

In 1969 it was awarded as Best Contemporary-Pop Performance, Instrumental
From 1970 to 1971 it was awarded as Best  Contemporary Instrumental Performance 
In 1972 it was awarded as Best Pop Instrumental Performance
In 1973 it was awarded as Best Pop Instrumental Performance by an Instrumental Performer 
From 1974 to 1975 it was again awarded as Best Pop Instrumental Performance
From 1986 to 1989 it was awarded as Best Pop Instrumental Performance (Orchestra, Group or Soloist)
Since 1990 it has again been awarded as Best Pop Instrumental Performance
The award was discontinued from 2011 in a major overhaul of Grammy categories. From 2012, all instrumental performances in the pop category (solo or with a duo/group) were shifted to either the newly formed Best Pop Solo Performance or Best Pop Duo/Group Performance categories.

A similar award for Best Instrumental Performance was awarded from 1965 to 1968.  This was also in the pop field, but did not specify pop music.

Recipients

 Each year is linked to the article about the Grammy Awards held that year.

See also
 List of Grammy Award categories
 Grammy Award for Best Instrumental Performance

References

External links
Official site of the Grammy Awards

Instrumental Performance
Awards disestablished in 2011
Awards established in 1969
Music-related lists